Albert Kitchener Iles (9 October 1914 – 30 November 1979) was a professional association footballer who played in The Football League for Bristol Rovers prior to the outbreak of World War II.

Football career
Iles began his footballing career playing in the Southern League for Tunbridge Wells Rangers. His prolific scoring record at that level earned him a professional contract with Bristol Rovers, signed on 24 September 1937. He immediately adjusted to the standard of football in Division 3 (South) of The Football League, and ended the 1937–38 season as The Pirates' top goalscorer with 14 goals from 31 games.

The following season, he scored a further five goals in fifteen League appearances, as well as featuring regularly for the reserve team. He played once in the aborted 1939–40 Football League season, and scored 16 goals in 29 wartime guest appearances for Rovers. He also made two guest appearances for Bristol City. After the war he played for Street, and was later trainer at Bristol St. George.

Non-footballing life
In 1939 Iles was working as a fitter at the Bristol Aeroplane Company, and he later spent many years working at SWEB in Bristol.

References

1914 births
1979 deaths
People from Royal Tunbridge Wells
English footballers
Association football forwards
Tunbridge Wells F.C. players
Bristol Rovers F.C. players
Bristol Rovers F.C. wartime guest players
Bristol City F.C. wartime guest players
Street F.C. players
Southern Football League players
English Football League players
Western Football League players